Connaught Coyne Marshner (born 1951), also known as Connie Marshner, is an American religious conservative political activist and commentator, associated with the second wave of the American New Right. She was executive vice-president of the Free Congress Foundation, and chair of Ronald Reagan's Family Policy Advisory Board. She is the author of Blackboard Tyranny and Decent Exposure: How to Teach Your Children About Sex, among other works.

Political activism 
Marshner's political career began in 1971 at the University of South Carolina, where she was heavily involved in Young Americans for Freedom, a conservative political organization. After college, she became assistant to the editor of its magazine, the New Guard. She wrote an influential critique of Walter Mondale's Child Development Bill that eventually led to its defeat. In 1973 she joined the Heritage Foundation as a researcher.

Marshner was one of the leaders of the Kanawha County textbook controversy in 1974. At the time she was education director at the Heritage Foundation and a speechwriter for conservative Republican congressmen such as Phil Crane. She led the organization of a series of "Citizens' Workshops" to defend the rights of parents to select their own textbooks and discuss the possibility of starting parent-run schools. Her experiences in Kanawha County inspired her to write Blackboard Tyranny, which instructed conservative parents on how to start their own schools.
By 1984, she was executive vice-president of the Free Congress Foundation, making her the highest ranking woman in the New Right. She left Washington to concentrate on raising her three surviving children in 1987, accepting a position as general editor for a Christian publishing house and setting up a home office.

Personal life 
Her father was a captain in the US Navy and she lived in several states as a child. She graduated from the University of South Carolina with a degree in secondary education in English. Since 1973, she has been married to William Marshner, a Thomistic theologian, ethicist, and a founding professor at Christendom College in Front Royal, Virginia, with whom she has five children, four surviving.

See also 
 Christian right

References 

1951 births
Activists from Virginia
American political activists
American social activists
Christians from Virginia
Education activists
The Heritage Foundation
Opposition to sex education
Living people
21st-century American women